Tuscany Suites and Casino is an all-suite hotel and casino situated on  in Paradise, Nevada. The hotel opened in 2001, while the casino opened in 2003.

History 
In 1988, Charles M. Heers purchased 17.5 acres from the Howard Hughes estate, and later purchased an additional 10 acres. Heers' family also owned the Vacation Village hotel and casino. For over a decade, a life-sized ship advertised Heers' plans for the Caribbean resort, which never materialized because of high costs. As early as 1997, Heers approached Gary Ellis, owner of the nearby Ellis Island Casino & Brewery, about the possibility of assuming or managing operations of the hotel-casino that was planned for the property.

Construction on the 716-room Italian-themed Tuscany hotel began in January 2001, with a planned opening later that summer. At that time, an additional 306 rooms and a casino were planned to open in fall 2001, with the casino planned to be managed by the Ellis Island casino. The all-suite Tuscany hotel opened in December 2001. The Tuscany Suites was developed by Inland Empire Builders.

In August 2002, the casino's opening was planned for November 2002. The 60,000 square-foot casino ultimately had a soft opening on January 17, 2003, with 800 slot machines, and eight table games. An official grand opening was planned within one or two months, after the completion of a 40,000 square-foot convention center. The casino was expected to boost the hotel's occupancy.

The Tuscany cost $100 million to build, and was owned by Heers and Arizona contractor Gaylord Yost, as well as Heers' company, CMH Real Estate Development Inc., which also operated three Las Vegas-area apartment complexes. The Tuscany had hoped to primarily attract a clientele of tourists and local residents, as well as employees from larger resorts on the Las Vegas Strip.

Negotiations with Gary Ellis began in January 2004, to combine the operations of Ellis Island and the Tuscany. In April 2004, Ellis agreed to invest in the Tuscany for joint ownership and the management of its casino. At that time, the Tuscany's casino had not been attracting its targeted clientele, partially because of competition from Ellis Island. In June 2004, Heers suddenly abandoned the deal before it was to be finalized. He subsequently ceased contact with Ellis. The following month, Ellis filed a lawsuit against Heers, accusing him of breach of contract, fraud and misappropriation of trade practices secrets. According to Heers' lawyer, Ellis changed the conditions of the deal, leading Heers to back out of it upon learning that Ellis planned to sell Ellis Island without combining the two properties into one company.

References 

Casinos in the Las Vegas Valley
Hotels in Paradise, Nevada
Casinos completed in 2003
Hotel buildings completed in 2001
Hotels established in 2001
2001 establishments in Nevada
Casino hotels